Hekmat-e Shirazi  حکمت شیرازی or Mirza Ali-Asghar Khan Hekmat-e Shirazi (16 June 1892 – 25 August 1980) was an Iranian politician, diplomat and author who served as the Iranian minister of foreign affairs, minister of justice, and minister of culture under the government of Reza Shah and Mohammad Reza Pahlavi, the Shahs of Iran. Hekmat was an Iranian ambassador to India and wrote multiple books about Indian history and culture. After the Islamic revolution in Iran, his books and works were ignored and he was labelled as a Freemason, but one of his books, Persian Inscriptions on Indian Monuments, was reprinted and introduced to Iranians.

See also
 History of Iran

References

Sources
Aḥmad Eqtedāri, Kārvān-e ʿomr: ḵāṭerāt-e siāsi-farhangi-ehaftād sāl ʿomr, Tehran, 1993, pp. 25–26, 205.
Ḥasan-ʿAli Ḥekmat, "Moḵtaṣari dar šarḥ-e zendegi-e ostād ʿAli-Aṣḡar Ḥekmat", unpublished pamphlet, Tehran, 1981.
Hormoz Ḥekmat, interviewed by A. Milani, 23 April 2002.
Bāqer Kāẓemi, in Iraj Afšār, ed., Nāmahā-ye Tehrān, Tehran, 2000, pp. 416–27.
Komisiun-e melli-e Yunesko (UNESCO) dar Īrān, Īrān-šahr, 2 vols., Tehran, 1963–64. Reżā Moʿini, ed., Čehrahā-yeāšnā, Tehran, 1965.
United States Department of State, Foreign Relations of the United States, 1958–1960, Washington, D.C., 1993.
Mehdi Walāʾi, "Fehrest-e nosaḵ-e vaqfi-e ʿAli-Aṣḡar Ḥekmat be Āstān-e qods-e rażavi,"ṟ Nosḵahā-ye ḵaṭṭi V, 1967, pp. 1–7.

External links

Iran and India relations span centuries marked by meaningful interactions, according to renowned Iranian Scholar, Dr. Mohammad Ajam.
"History of Persian or Parsi Language" — Iran Chamber Society
soas.ac.uk
First steps of Hekmat: the diary of Mirza Ali-Asghar Khan Hekmat-e Shirazi 
Catalogue of Persian manuscripts in the library of the India office, Volume 1 (1903)

1892 births
1980 deaths
Government ministers of Iran
History of India
Iranian democracy activists
Iranian governors
University of Paris alumni
Ambassadors of Iran to India